Playcentre is an early childhood education and parenting organisation which operates parent-led early childhood education centres throughout New Zealand and offers parents the opportunity to gain a Certificate in Early Childhood and Adult Education.

When the first playcentre was opened in 1941 the prevailing philosophy in New Zealand child education was that education did not really start until children entered the formal, disciplinarian, school system. Playcentres instead recognised the value of early child education and specifically the educational value of child-initiated play.

The playcentre concept originated in New Zealand, but is now also established in Japan.

Their mission is stated as "Whānau Tupu Ngātahi - Families growing together."

History and spread

The movement started during the Second World War to provide a break for mothers as well as means to allow for the social development of the child within a cooperative environment. In the initial years of the war, educator Gwen Somerset, who is responsible for the movement's philosophy, began to use Feilding's Community Centre (which in itself was the first in New Zealand) to hold classes on child development and parenting, and to facilitate children's daycare by means of a playgroup; this acting as the forerunner experiment to the playcentre movement. The first proper playcentre was established in 1941 in the Wellington suburb of Karori. From the start each playcentre was a community driven initiative, organised by parents, utilising existing premises (e.g. church or community halls) and using parents as teachers.  This allowed the easy spread of the movement, now encompassing over 450 centres around New Zealand and explains why they are the dominant provider of early childhood education in rural areas.

Gwen Somerset, Joan Wood, Inge Smithells and Beatrice Beeby were among the founders of the organisation.

The Playcentre model has been copied by groups in other countries, including the Japan Playcentre Association.

Philosophy
Playcentre was instrumental in introducing the concept of education through play and through child-initiated activities to the early childhood setting in New Zealand. This philosophy has since been adopted throughout all New Zealand early childhood education centres through the New Zealand national curriculum for early childhood education, Te Whāriki.  They remain a champion of child-led non-structured play as the best form of education in early childhood.

The organisation believes that parents are the first and best educators of their children and children learn best when they initiate their learning through play (child-initiated play). Within the centres children and adults learn alongside each other, in agreement with the socio-cultural model of learning which posits that a child learns best when surrounded by trusted members of his or her community.

Each playcentre is a cooperative. Parents decide how their centre will run and are responsible for the education of their children. Parents also make decisions giving direction to how their association (regional body) and the New Zealand Playcentre Federation (national body) will run.

Practice
Children attend half day sessions, no more than 5 times a week.  Children from 0 to 6 years, normally in mixed age groups, attend sessions run by parents.  Parents manage all aspects of each playcentre, including the premises, administration, education of the children and education of themselves.

Structure
Every centre is part of a regional association. There are currently 33 regional associations, which provide support and training and are governed by their member Playcentres. In turn each association is supported by the national body, The New Zealand Playcentre Federation. The Federation is governed by the associations and provides support to meet the goals of the associations.

Playcentres are chartered early childhood education providers with the New Zealand Ministry of Education.  Independent research and audits by the Education Review Office confirm the quality of Playcentre's programmes.

Adult education programme
Playcentre Education administers the NZQA approved Playcentre Diploma in Early Childhood and Adult Education. The course assists parents in developing their parenting skills and their ability to facilitate early childhood education in a playcentre setting. The programme also helps members to learn how to work in a cooperative as well as being the training ground for Playcentre adult educators. The adult education programme is delivered at no cost to the learner.

Notable Playcentre people

Famous Playcentre alumni include New Zealand's first female Prime Minister, the Rt. Hon. Jenny Shipley, New Zealand's first female Governor General, Dame Catherine Tizard, the Olympic gold medallists, Caroline Evers-Swindell and Georgina Evers-Swindell, Colin Simon  (designer of the Christchurch Commonwealth Games 1974 games - Christchurch, New Zealand  symbol and the Playcentre Logo), and Valerie Burns (Companion of the Queen's Service Order ).

Further reading
Laurenson, P and Wylie, L.(2000) Millennium Special Edition: Playcentre People. Playcentre Journal, 109, pp17–14
Stover, Sue (Ed). (2003). (Revised edition). Good clean fun: New Zealand’s playcentre movement. Auckland: New Zealand Playcentre Federation.  pp 99, 240.
Densem, A. & Chapman, B. (2000). Learning together: The Playcentre Way. Auckland: New Zealand Playcentre Federation.  p35
http://www.educate.ece.govt.nz/Programmes/TeWhariki.aspx
http://www8.plala.or.jp/playcentre/

External links
New Zealand Playcentre Federation

References

Education in New Zealand
Early childhood education in New Zealand
Early childhood educational organizations